The 1996–97 Esiliiga is the sixth season of the Esiliiga, second-highest Estonian league for association football clubs, since its establishment in 1992.

Main tournament
Played in fall 1996.

Four best teams qualify to the Premier Division promotion play-off, other four to First Division promotion play-off.

Table

Top scorers

Premier Division promotion play-off
Played in spring 1997.

None of the four teams were able to finish above the two teams from Premier Division, so they all remain in the First Division for the upcoming season.

Table

Top scorers

First Division promotion play-off
Played in spring 1997.

JK Merkuur Tartu and JK Dokker Tallinn promoted from Second Division, while JK Tulevik Viljandi and FC Norma Tallinn were relegated.

Table

See also
1996–97 Meistriliiga
1996 in Estonian football
1997 in Estonian football

External links
 Estonia 1996/97 rsssf.com

Esiliiga seasons
2
2
Estonia